The 1997 UCI Track Cycling World Cup Classics is a multi race tournament over a season of track cycling. The competition ran from May 23  to August 17, 1997. The World Cup is organised by the UCI.

Results

Men

Women

References

Round 1, Cali
Round 2, Trexlertown
Round 3, Fiorenzuola
Round 4, Quatro Sant’Elana
Round 5, Athens
Round 6, Adelaide

World Cup Classics
UCI Track Cycling World Cup